"Rainy Day People" is a song written and recorded by Gordon Lightfoot, released on his 1975 album, Cold on the Shoulder, and also as a single. "Rainy Day People" went to number 26 on the Billboard Hot 100. It was Lightfoot's last of four songs to reach number one on the Easy Listening chart, spending one week at number one in May 1975.

Personnel
Gordon Lightfoot – vocal, acoustic guitar
Terry Clements – acoustic guitar
Red Shea – acoustic guitar
Rick Haynes – bass
Pee Wee Charles – pedal steel guitar
Nick DeCaro – piano, string arrangement
Jim Gordon – drums

Chart performance

See also
List of number-one adult contemporary singles of 1975 (U.S.)

References

Gordon Lightfoot songs
1975 singles
Songs written by Gordon Lightfoot
Reprise Records singles
1975 songs
Song recordings produced by Lenny Waronker